Te Kuiti railway station is a station on the North Island Main Trunk in New Zealand. The station was important in the growth of Te Kuiti.

History 
Tenders for the  extension of the NIMT from Ōtorohanga to Te Kuiti were invited in August 1885. However, from 17 September 1885 work was suspended after William Russell got Parliamentary support to cut spending on public works. A year later Coates & Metcalfe of Hamilton won the construction contract for £17,273 in September 1886 and work started quickly. The line opened on 2 September 1887 for goods. By October 1887 goods trains ran on Mondays and Fridays and the station was being built. A contract with Arthur Burn for the station buildings was signed on 29 August 1887 and they were completed by 19 December. New Zealand Railways Department took over from the contractors, adding a passenger service on those days from 2 December 1887. Te Kuiti was the terminus for over a year, until the  extension to Puketutu opened on Wednesday 8 May 1889. By November 1889 Te Kuiti had lost its stationmaster and become a flag station. However, by 1896 there was a 4th class station, platform, cart approach,  by  goods shed, cattle yards, water supply from a well, coal bunker, engine shed, loading bank, urinals and a passing loop for 31 wagons. There was a Post Office at the station until 1907, when a stationmaster was reappointed and railway houses, a  turntable and more sidings were built.

The first Auckland - Wellington through expresses ran on 14 February 1909, taking 19 hours 13 minutes, and stopping at Te Kuiti. Since then, trains calling have included The Overlander, Blue Streak, Silver Fern, Scenic Daylight, Daylight Limited, Northerner and Night Limited. Since 2012 it has only seen occasional calls by excursions and to set down or pick up groups of 10 or more, booked on the Northern Explorer.

In 1910 a bookstall was added. More houses were built in 1910, 1927, 1952, 1953 and 1955. In 1940 a new goods shed and stockyards were completed.

Te Kuiti had an engine shed from 1887. It was improved in 1911. By 1919 it had 5 engines and by 1924 2 of its 6 had to remain outside. On 28 January 1925 engine A 424 was on the turntable when it cracked. It was replaced by a turntable from East Town until £1060 was spent on a new 70 foot turntable later in the year. BB engines were also stabled at Te Kuiti, which had 8 engines by 1928.

By 1966 the coaling bunker had been removed, the engine shed was in poor condition and a diesel shunter had replaced steam engines. By 1968 the shed was demolished and the turntable was removed.

Listed building
Since 1985 the building has been listed NZHPT Category II. The Rail Heritage Trust describes the station as, "the finest remaining example of a standard class B station". It dates from 1908 (the old station was moved to Ongarue), when George Troup (best known for Dunedin railway station) was the head of railway architecture. After a deputation to the Minister, it was moved from the west to the east (town side) of the tracks in 1911, and a verandah was added. The alterations are evidenced by double-hung sash windows either side, but casement windows to the south. In 1921 it was proposed that NZR take over the refreshment rooms. In 1968 the corrugated iron refreshment building was reported as built in 1956.

A 'Revitalisation Project' started in 2014 to provide for arts and crafts groups, an education centre, youth projects, historical displays and a meeting room.

Patronage 
As shown in the table and graph below, passenger numbers peaked in 1944 -

References

External links
6 April 1955 aerial view of Te Kuiti
1889 timetable

Railway stations in New Zealand
Railway station
Rail transport in Waikato
Heritage New Zealand Category 2 historic places in Waikato
Buildings and structures in Waikato